The Canadian Baptists of Atlantic Canada (CBAC), formerly known as Convention of Atlantic Baptist Churches (CABC), is an association of Baptist Churches in the eastern provinces of Canada. The offices of the CBAC are located in Moncton, New Brunswick.  The union is one of four components of Canadian Baptist Ministries.

History
The Baptist Convention of the Maritime Provinces was founded in 1846. The Canadian Baptists of Atlantic Canada was formed in 1905-1906 as the United Baptist Convention of the Maritimes by a union of Free, or Free Will Baptists and Calvinistic or Regular Baptists. The Regular Baptist and Free Will Baptist congregations wrote a statement of faith and polity called the "Basis of Union" with which both groups could agree. With the addition of Newfoundland to Canada, the name was changed to the United Baptist Convention of the Atlantic Provinces in 1963. Many of these churches still carry "United Baptist" in their official name.  In 2001, the name was changed to the Convention of Atlantic Baptist Churches. In 2016, the name was changed to the Canadian Baptists of Atlantic Canada.

Since 1944 CBAC has been one of the partners in the Canadian Baptist Federation (now known as Canadian Baptist Ministries).

Organization
In 2020, it had 450 churches and 21 associations across the Atlantic provinces (New Brunswick, Newfoundland, Nova Scotia & Prince Edward Island). The CBAC is subdivided into nine regions for local cooperation.

Beliefs 
The denomination has a Baptist confession of faith. The Union is a member of Canadian Baptist Ministries and Evangelical Fellowship of Canada.

Education
Crandall University is a partner of the Union.
It houses the Baptist Heritage Center whose 300 artifacts preserve the material history of Atlantic Baptists, the Canadian Baptists of Atlantic Canada, and its predecessor organizations. The collection and archives includes objects used in worship services, furniture, musical instruments, church building architecture pictures and printed material.

Sources
Baptists Around the World, by Albert W. Wardin, Jr.
The Baptist Heritage: Four Centuries of Baptist Witness, by H. Leon McBeth

See also
Baptists in Canada
Henry Alline

External links

References

1905 establishments in Canada
Christian organizations established in 1905
Baptist denominations established in the 20th century
Baptist Christianity in Canada
Baptist denominations in North America
Evangelical denominations in North America
Organizations based in Moncton